Hot Tuna is an Australian surf and street clothing brand. It was established in 1969. In 2012, the brand was acquired by Frasers Group for £1 million and was renamed to Concha. Hot Tuna's executive chairman, Francis Ball, stepped down from his position after the sale.

Logo 
The company's main logo is a custom artistic print of a Piranha designed by Peter Fernley.

Events Sponsored 
Hot Tuna have sponsored surfing events such as the WQS Hot Tuna Central Coast Pro at Soldiers Beach on the Central Coast of New South Wales, the Hot Tuna Summer Classic at Gunnamatta Beach on the Victoria coastline in Australia and the Hot Tuna Summer of 69 at St Agnes in Cornwall, United Kingdom.

References

External links
 
 

Surfwear brands
Swimwear manufacturers
Clothing companies established in 1969
Clothing brands of Australia
Sports Direct
Australian companies established in 1969